Marc Torrejón Moya (born 18 February 1986) is a Spanish former professional footballer who played as a central defender.

Club career

Spain
Born in Barcelona, Catalonia, Torrejón was a product of hometown RCD Espanyol's youth ranks. He spent the 2005–06 season on loan to Málaga CF's reserves in the Segunda División and, upon returning to Espanyol, became a defensive centerpiece alongside another club trainee, Daniel Jarque. His La Liga debut came on 1 October 2006, in a 0–0 away draw against CA Osasuna.

Torrejón appeared in ten UEFA Cup games in the 2006–07 campaign, as the Pericos went all the way to the final. There, he missed the decisive shot in a 3–1 penalty shootout loss to Sevilla FC.

The following season, Torrejón scored his first professional goal, in a 2–1 defeat at Real Valladolid on 20 January 2008. In 2008–09 he played almost no part in the team, due to the signing of Argentine Nicolás Pareja.

On 17 July 2009, Torrejón signed a four-year contract with Racing de Santander for €1,6 million. He was arguably the most solid defender for the Cantabrians in his first year, only being booked four times in the league, although the side barely escaped relegation.

Germany
Torrejón left Racing at the end of 2011–12, which ended in relegation. On 26 August 2012, he joined German club 1. FC Kaiserslautern on a three-year contract. He made his league debut against MSV Duisburg on 16 September, playing the full 90 minutes in the home 2–1 win, and scored his first goal in the 2. Bundesliga on 5 May, in a 4–1 home victory over FSV Frankfurt.

On 27 August 2014, Torrejón moved to the Bundesliga after signing with SC Freiburg for an undisclosed fee. He made his first appearance in the German top flight exactly one month later, as an 80th-minute substitute for Jonathan Schmid in a goalless home draw with Bayer 04 Leverkusen.

Torrejón retired at the age of 33, after two years in the second tier with 1. FC Union Berlin where he dealt with recurrent injuries.

International career
Torrejón won 14 caps for Spain at youth level. He participated at the 2009 UEFA European Championship with the under-21 team, scoring in the 2–0 group stage win over Finland.

Personal life
Torrejón's sister, Marta, is also a footballer. She also played for Espanyol (spending time with FC Barcelona as well), and represented the Spain national team.

References

External links

1986 births
Living people
Spanish footballers
Footballers from Barcelona
Association football defenders
La Liga players
Segunda División players
Segunda División B players
RCD Espanyol B footballers
RCD Espanyol footballers
Atlético Malagueño players
Racing de Santander players
Bundesliga players
2. Bundesliga players
1. FC Kaiserslautern players
SC Freiburg players
1. FC Union Berlin players
Spain youth international footballers
Spain under-21 international footballers
Spanish expatriate footballers
Expatriate footballers in Germany
Spanish expatriate sportspeople in Germany